Inreachtach mac Dluthach, 21st King of Uí Maine, died 750.

Ancestry

Inreachtach was the son of king Dluthach mac Fithcheallach (died 738). His descent from king Cairbre Crom (fl. c. 556) is given as "Innrachtach, son of Dluthach, son of Oilell, son of Innrechtach, son of Dluthach, son of Fithchellach, son of Dicholla, son of Eoghan Finn, son of Cormac, son of Cairpri Crom."

Descendants

He had one recorded son, Ailell mac Inreachtach, who became king, and died c.791/799.

Reign

Inreachtach's reign was brief. The Annals of the Four Masters note his death sub anno 750 though neither the details or context of the circumstances are given.

Dynastic ramifications

His brother, Flaitheamail, was the ancestor of a sept of the dynasty called Clann Flaitheamail.

His first cousin, Cosgrach, son of Fidhchellach, had as his great-great grandson Flann mac Aedhagan, who was the ancestor of the Clann Mac Aodhagáin (Egan).

Notes

References

 Annals of Ulster at CELT: Corpus of Electronic Texts at University College Cork
 Annals of Tigernach at CELT: Corpus of Electronic Texts at University College Cork
Revised edition of McCarthy's synchronisms at Trinity College Dublin.
 Byrne, Francis John (2001), Irish Kings and High-Kings, Dublin: Four Courts Press,

External links
 Commentary by Dan M. Wiley (The Cycles of the Kings Web Project)

People from County Galway
People from County Roscommon
750 deaths
8th-century Irish monarchs
Year of birth unknown
Kings of Uí Maine